Aethes nefandana is a species of moth of the family Tortricidae. It was described by Kennel in 1899. It is found in Austria, the Czech Republic, Slovakia, Croatia, Albania, Bulgaria, Romania, North Macedonia, Greece, Russia, Asia Minor and western Kazakhstan.

Adults are on wing from April to July.

The larvae feed on Eryngium species.

References

nefandana
Moths described in 1899
Moths of Europe
Moths of Asia